Nataniela Oto (born May 26, 1980) is a Tongan-Japanese rugby union player. He plays as a flanker. In 2004, he obtained Japanese citizenship.  He is the brother of Lopeti Oto, who played for the Japanese national rugby union team in the 1995 Rugby World Cup.

Oto plays for Toshiba Brave Lupus. He has 12 caps for Japan, with 4 tries scored, 20 points in aggregate, from 2001 to 2007. He was present at the 2007 Rugby World Cup, playing a single match, in the 91–3 loss to Australia. He has been absent from his National Team since then.

External links
Nataniela Oto International Statistics

1980 births
Living people
Tongan rugby union players
Japanese rugby union players
Toshiba Brave Lupus Tokyo players
Tongan emigrants to Japan
Naturalized citizens of Japan
Japan international rugby union players
Tongan expatriate rugby union players
Expatriate rugby union players in Japan
Tongan expatriate sportspeople in Japan
Japan international rugby sevens players